Paduka Sri Sultan Abdullah Mukarram Shah ibni al-Marhum Sultan Muhammad Jiwa Zainal Adilin Mu'adzam Shah II (died 1 September 1797) was the 20th Sultan of Kedah who reigned from 1778 to 1797. In 1780, he ordered the fortress of Kota Kuala Bahang that was destroyed by Aceh in 1619 to be rebuilt in exactly the same way as the original.

Threat of Siam 
The war between Burma and Siam lasted from  1753 to 1781. While the war was still ongoing, Kedah had stopped the delivery of "Bunga Mas" to Siam. After the war ended, Siam once again became a very powerful force, demanded Kedah to resume sending the "Bunga Mas" to Siam which led Sultan Abdullah to feel threatened by the demands. He wanted to preserve the sovereignty of Kedah and the welfare of the people. Sultan Abdullah chose to seek military assistance from East India Company (EIC). He offered Penang Island to them if the were willing to protect Kedah from the Siamese threat. Francis Light knowing the importance of the Penang Port and the usage of military bases saw the offer as irresistible although the EIC wanted to protect the interests of trade with Siam.

Agreement, occupation and betrayal 
Francis Light personally have come to an agreement with Sultan Abdullah in the year 1786. Sultan Abdullah let Francis Light to stay in Penang provided that he must provide military assistance for Kedah when needed.

The agreement consists of : 
 EIC has to provide military assistance for Kedah as long as Kedah is attacked by enemies.
 EIC must not lead the enemies of Kedah.
 EIC needs to pay as much as 30 000 Spanish Dollars each year to Sultan Abdullah as reparation. 
On 11 August 1786, the Union Jack was raised. Francis Light named Penang as "Prince of Wales Island" and their settlement as "Georgetown".after the British King, King George III. This marks the start of the British Occupation in Malaya. The year 1786, Siam conquered Patani and threatens Kedah. Sultan Abdullah demanded military assistance from the EIC as the agreement indicated. The EIC refused to give assistance because Sultan Abdullah only agreed with Francis Light, but not the EIC. Sultan Abdullah forced Francis Light out of Penang. Francis Light was reluctant to let go of Penang and offered payment of damages but was rejected by Sultan Abdullah. In 1791, Sultan Abdullah with the help of Riau, Siak and Selangor, was able to prepare a navy to attack and retake Penang. Francis Light asked assistance from the British Military to attack the stronghold of Sultan Abdullah in Seberang Perai. Sultan Abdullah lost and had come to a peace treaty on 1 May 1791. With this peace treaty, EIC officially annexed Penang. As a reward, EIC will pay as much as 6000 Spanish Dollars every year to Sultan Abdullah.

Family 
He married his first wife, H.H. Tengku Puneh binti al-Marhum Sultan Sallehuddin Shah, Tengku Besar, before divorcing two years later.

 One son with Wan Mek
 Tunku Yahya
 Three sons and six daughters with Wan Kamaliah, Tuan Mas, daughter of the Dato’ Sri Paduka Raja Laksamana of Kedah
 Tunku Ahmad Tajuddin
 Tunku Bisnu
 Tunku Ahmad
 Tunku Hitam
 Tunku Chik
 Tunku Zamzam
 Three sons and one daughter with Che Puan Paduka Bonda, a princess from Patani (daughter of Sultan Muhammad ‘Abdu’l Jalil Karimu’llah Mualim Shah, Raja of Patani?)
 Tunku Ibrahim
 Tunku Sulaiman
 Tunku Kusu
 One son with Che Fatima Dewi, Che Mas
 Tunku Daud
 Two sons and two daughters with Che’ Chandra Sari
 Tunku Ya’akub
 Tunku Muhammad Yusuf
 Two daughters with Che’ Bida Sari

External links 
 List of Sultans of Kedah

1797 deaths
18th-century Sultans of Kedah